The Raid Pyrénéen is a timed bicycle challenge over a route that traverses the length of the Pyrenees between Hendaye on the Atlantic coast and Cerbère on the Mediterranean, organised by Cyclo Club Béarnais since 1950.

Format
It can be completed in either direction - West to East, which is the most popular, or East to West. Around 300 people complete this "randonnée" each year, between 1 June and 30 September, either entering the event as an individual and riding independently, taking care of their own arrangements, or joining an organised event run by one of the many tour companies, who look after all the arrangements and support the riders - either staying in hotels, or camping.

There are two official versions: a 720 km route to be completed in under 100 hours for randonneurs or a 790 km route to be completed in under 10 days for cycle-tourists. A medal and certificate are awarded on successful completion. Participants enter the event by contacting the CCB and obtaining an official "carnet", which they get stamped at various control points (usually cafés or shops) along the route. There is a modest entry fee, which covers the carnet, the certificate and the medal.

Route
The 10-day route passes over 28 cols:

The 100-hour route passes over 18 cols, although riders have the option of adding the Marie Blanque if they wish:

References
 Cyclo-Club Béarnais (French)

Cycling in France